Caishikou Execution Grounds, also known as Vegetable Market Execution Ground, was an important execution ground in Beijing during the Qing Dynasty. It was located at the crossroads of Xuanwumen Outer Street and Luomashi Street. The exact location is under debate today. However, contemporary sources and photographs put it across from the Heniantang Pharmacy.

Executions were usually carried out at 11:30 AM. On the day of the execution, the convict would be carted from the jail cell to the execution grounds. The cart stopped at a wine shop named Broken Bowl on the east side of Xuanwu Gate, where the convict would be offered a bowl of rice wine. The bowl would be smashed after it was drunk. During the executions of infamous convicts, it was common for a large crowd to gather and watch. The torture death by a thousand cuts was also carried out at the execution ground. Many members of the House of Zhu of the Ming dynasty were purged and executed at Caishikou during the Qing dynasty.

The Catholic bishop Alphonse Favier wrote about the execution ground in the 1890s:

Notable individuals executed at Caishikou
Zhu Yousong, or Hongguang Emperor, the first emperor of the Southern Ming Dynasty.
Zhu Changfang, a member of the royal family of Southern Ming Dynasty.
Zhu Cunji (朱存極), Ming dynasty King of Qin (秦王)
Zhu Shenxuan (朱审烜), Ming dynasty Prince of Jin (晉世子)
Zhu Youzou (朱由棷), Ming dynasty King of Heng (衡王)
Zhu Ciyue (朱慈爚), Ming dynasty King of Chong (崇王)
Zhu Youli (朱由櫟), Ming dynasty King of De (德王)
Zhu Cikui (朱慈煃), Ming dynasty King of Ji (吉王)
Zheng Zhilong, father of Koxinga.
Jahangir Khoja, East Turkic rebel leader.
Six gentlemen of the Hundred Days' Reform, including Tan Sitong and Lin Xu.
Xu Jingcheng, Qing diplomat, during the Boxer Rebellion.
Qixiu (启秀), Manchu pro-Boxer official
Zhong Renjie (鍾人傑)
Lin Fengxiang (林鳳祥)
Li Kaifang, Taiping rebel
Li Hanjie (李漢傑)
Yang Rui (杨锐)
Yang Shenxiu (杨深秀)

See also
Caishikou

References

History of Beijing
Law in Qing dynasty
Execution sites in China